Arthur John "Artie" Gall (29 September 1885 – 19 September 1953) was an Australian rules footballer who played for the University Football Club in the Victorian Football League (VFL).

References

Sources
 Holmesby, Russell & Main, Jim (2007). The Encyclopedia of AFL Footballers. 7th ed. Melbourne: Bas Publishing.

External links

1885 births
Australian rules footballers from Bendigo
University Football Club players
1953 deaths